Leucanopsis toledana is a moth of the family Erebidae. It was described by William Schaus in 1941. It is found in Bolivia, Ecuador and Peru.

References

toledana
Moths described in 1941